UFC on Fox: Lawler vs. Brown (also known as UFC on Fox 12) was a mixed martial arts event held on July 26, 2014, at SAP Center in San Jose, California.

Background
The event was headlined by a welterweight bout between Matt Brown and Robbie Lawler. UFC president Dana White subsequently announced that the winner of the main event would receive a title shot against UFC welterweight champion Johny Hendricks.

Viscardi Andrade was briefly scheduled to face Andreas Ståhl at the event.  However, Andrade was replaced on the card by promotional newcomer Gilbert Burns.

Michael Johnson was expected to face Josh Thomson at the event.  However, on July 11, Johnson pulled out of the bout and was replaced by Bobby Green.

Due to programming needs, the televised preliminaries were shifted to Fox instead of being aired on Fox Sports 1 or Fox Sports 2.

During weigh-ins, both Brown and Lima missed weight for their fights against Lawler and Jędrzejczyk, respectively. They were supposed to be fined 20% of their salary (10% to their opponent and 10% to the commission), but both fighters were not fined due to a commission error. Brown weighed in at 172.5 lb but was not allowed by the California State Athletic Commission to weigh in again, while Lima initially came in at 117 lb and only dropped to 116.5 lb and she was also denied another try. Both remained eligible for the UFC's post-fight bonus awards.

This event also marks the debuts of former UFC Strawweight Champion Joanna Jędrzejczyk and UFC Featherweight Championship Challenger Brian Ortega.

Results

Bonus awards
The following fighters were awarded $50,000 bonuses:

 Fight of the Night: Robbie Lawler vs. Matt Brown
 Performance of the Night: Anthony Johnson and Dennis Bermudez

Reported payout
The following is the reported payout to the fighters as reported to the California State Athletic Commission. It does not include sponsor money or "locker room" bonuses often given by the UFC and also do not include the UFC's traditional "fight night" bonuses.

Robbie Lawler: $210,000 ($105,000 win bonus) def. Matt Brown: $46,000
Anthony Johnson: $106,000 ($53,000 win bonus) def. Antônio Rogério Nogueira: $114,000
Dennis Bermudez: $48,000 ($24,000 win bonus) def. Clay Guida: $50,000
Bobby Green: $42,000 ($21,000 win bonus) def. Josh Thomson: $84,000
Jorge Masvidal: $84,000 ($42,000 win bonus) def. Daron Cruickshank: $12,000
Patrick Cummins: $20,000 ($10,000 win bonus) def. Kyle Kingsbury: $15,000
Tim Means: $20,000 ($10,000 win bonus) def. Hernani Perpétuo: $8,000
Brian Ortega: $16,000 ($8,000 win bonus) def. Mike De La Torre: $8,000
Tiago Trator: $16,000 ($8,000 win bonus) def. Akbarh Arreola: $8,000
Gilbert Burns: $16,000 ($8,000 win bonus) def. Andreas Ståhl: $8,000
Joanna Jędrzejczyk: $16,000 ($8,000 win bonus) def. Juliana Lima: $8,000
Noad Lahat: $16,000 ($8,000 win bonus) def. Steven Siler: $15,000

See also
List of UFC events
2014 in UFC

References

Fox UFC
Events in San Jose, California
Mixed martial arts in San Jose, California
Sports competitions in San Jose, California
2014 in mixed martial arts